Jagathgirigutta is a residential neighbourhood in Hyderabad, Telangana, India. It falls under Qutbullapur mandal of Medchal-Malkajgiri district. It is administered as Ward No. 126 of Greater Hyderabad Municipal Corporation.

Jagathgirigutta literally means "Universal Hill" in Telugu and a famous Lord Venkateshwara Temple located on the hillock where an annual carnival is held.

References

Neighbourhoods in Hyderabad, India
Cities and towns in Medchal–Malkajgiri district
Municipal wards of Hyderabad, India